Ashley Williams Dodson (born November 12, 1978), known as Ashley Williams, is an American actress. She is known for starring in the television series The Jim Gaffigan Show on TV Land and in the NBC series Good Morning Miami. Williams played Victoria on the CBS series How I Met Your Mother opposite Josh Radnor. She has starred in more than a dozen different television pilots over the years and done over 150 episodes of television in addition to television movies for The Hallmark Channel, Lifetime Television, and ABC Family. She has worked in studio and independent films, regional theater, Off-Broadway, and on Broadway.

Early life and education
Williams was born in Westchester County, New York, the daughter of Linda Barbara, and Gurney Williams III, a freelance health and science writer. She is the younger sister of actress Kimberly Williams-Paisley and is sister-in-law to country music star Brad Paisley.

Williams attended Rye High School in Rye, New York. In May 2001 she received her Bachelor of Fine Arts from the Boston University College of Fine Arts School of Theatre.

Career
Williams made her acting debut in a non-speaking role in the 1993 drama Indian Summer, which also featured her sister Kimberly. She then spent from 1994 to 1996 playing teenage Danielle Andropoulos on the soap opera As the World Turns.

Williams starred in the television series Good Morning, Miami (2002–2004). Since then she has also appeared in episodes of Psych, How I Met Your Mother, multiple episodes of E-Ring, multiple episodes of Huff, Law & Order: Special Victims Unit, multiple episodes of Side Order of Life, The Mentalist, Monk, C.S.I., Royal Pains, multiple episodes of Saving Grace, Love Bites, The Protector, Retired at 35, and multiple episodes of Warehouse 13. Williams also had a guest-starring role on American Dreams, playing singer Sandie Shaw and performing Shaw's 1964 hit "(There's) Always Something There to Remind Me" on American Bandstand.

In 2007, she starred in the Off Broadway play Burleigh Grime$ and appeared as Victoria, a cupcake baker, on six episodes of the television series How I Met Your Mother; a role she reprised in the concluding seasons of the show.

In 2010, she starred in the made-for-TV Lifetime movies, Patricia Cornwell's The Front and At Risk, which premiered on the channel on April 17, 2010. She also won an on-line straw poll conducted by the How I Met Your Mother production staff as to which ex-girlfriend of Ted Mosby, the show's main character, is the fans' favorite. Her character, Victoria, won 128 to 117 over Robin Scherbatsky.

In 2011 and 2012, she played the role of Claire in a film adaptation of Something Borrowed opposite Kate Hudson, John Krasinski, and her college roommate Ginnifer Goodwin, and she also reprised her role as Victoria on How I Met Your Mother.

She made her Broadway debut in John Grisham's A Time To Kill playing law student Ellen Roarke, on September 28, 2013, with the opening night on October 20, 2013. She had previously worked at the Williamstown Theater Festival, and also worked as the understudy for both Rachel Weisz and Gretchen Mol opposite Paul Rudd in the world premiere Off-Broadway production of Neil LaBute's play The Shape of Things. She performed both lead female roles multiple times during the run.

In 2015 and 2016, Williams starred as a fictionalized version of comedian Jim Gaffigan's real life wife in The Jim Gaffigan Show on Comedy central, a sitcom about a couple raising their five young children in a two-bedroom New York City apartment which also starred Michael Ian Black and Adam Goldberg.

She wrote, directed, and starred in a short film, Meats, about a pregnant vegan who wrestles with her newfound craving for meat. It was shown at the Sundance Film Festival in January 2020.

Personal life
Williams married independent film producer Neal Dodson on May 29, 2011. They have two sons: Gus Williams Dodson (b. October 5, 2014) and Odie Sal Dodson (b. May 17, 2017). In the summer of 2016, Williams was two months pregnant and suffered a miscarriage. She partnered with the Human Development Project to speak publicly about the experience, in hopes of reducing the stigma of miscarriage and encouraging more women to talk openly about it. Williams is a certified birth doula.

Filmography

References

External links
Official website

1978 births
Living people
American television actresses
American stage actresses
21st-century American actresses